Johan Lindström (born March 31, 1979) is a Swedish former professional ice hockey forward. After beginning his professional career with HV71 in the Swedish Elitserien during the 1997–98 season, he played 18 professional seasons with notable stints at Linköpings HC and Mora IK before announcing his retirement after a final season with HC Dalen on March 7, 2015.

The 1995–1996 and 1996–1997 seasons saw him winning the Swedish Junior Championship with HV71, while the 2007–2008 and 2009–2010 seasons saw him winning the Swedish Senior Championship with the same club.

References

External links 

1979 births
Swedish ice hockey right wingers
HV71 players
Linköping HC players
Mora IK players
Living people